Azniv Hrachia (1853-1920) was an Ottoman Armenian actress and director.

She debuted on the Oriental Theater in 1869 and was later engaged at the Ottoman Theater. In the 1880s she was active in Tiflis. She retired in 1883 for private reasons, but resumed her career in 1893 and was active in Baku, where she also debuted as a director of plays.

References 
 Duygu Köksal,Anastasia Falierou: A Social History of Late Ottoman Women: New Perspectives
 Women in the Ottoman Empire by Eric R Dursteler, Oxford Reference Online

1853 births
1920 deaths
Ethnic Armenian actresses
Armenians from the Ottoman Empire
19th-century Armenian actors
Stage actresses from the Ottoman Empire
19th-century actresses from the Ottoman Empire